Gideon Ben-Yisrael (6 March 1923 – 18 December 2014) was an Israeli politician who served as a member of the Knesset for Mapai and Rafi in the 1950s and 1960s.

Biography
Born in Haifa during the Mandate era, Ben-Yisrael joined the Haganah, and between 1938 and 1940 was a recruiting officer in Jerusalem. During World War II he volunteered for the Jewish Brigade, and following the war he helped to smuggle holocaust survivors into Palestine. He then fought in the 1948 Arab-Israeli War and was wounded in the Battle for Jerusalem. He was demobilised from the IDF as a major.

After the war, he studied economics and international relations at the London School of Economics. He returned to Israel in 1953 and served as secretary of the Beersheba Workers Council, and was head of Labor Relations in the Ministry of Labour. He also lectured on labour relations at Tel Aviv University and the Hebrew University, and was a member of the co-ordinating committee of the Histadrut trade union, and chairman of its Organisation and Workers Council section.

In 1955 he married Ruth Ne'eman, sister of Yuval (later a government minister), who went on to become a law professor. They had two children, Marit and Sivion.

In 1959 he was elected to the Knesset on the Mapai list. The following year he received a graduate law degree from the Tel Aviv branch of the Hebrew University of Jerusalem. Although he lost his seat in the 1961 elections, he returned to the Knesset on 28 August 1962 as a replacement for the deceased Herzl Berger. He was amongst the Mapai members that broke away to form Rafi in 1965, and lost his seat in the elections later that year. He went on to serve as chair of the Labor Party's unions section, and was a member of the party's central committee and secretariat.

In 1996 he became chairman of the Pensioners' Union in the Histadrut, a position he held until his death in December 2014.

Ben-Yisrael died in Tel Aviv from natural causes. He was buried at the Trumpeldor Cemetery in Tel Aviv.

References

External links
 

1923 births
2014 deaths
People from Haifa
Aliyah Bet activists
Haganah members
British Army personnel of World War II
Jews in Mandatory Palestine
Israeli soldiers
Alumni of the London School of Economics
Hebrew University of Jerusalem Faculty of Law alumni
Israeli lawyers
Israeli trade unionists
Academic staff of the Hebrew University of Jerusalem
Academic staff of Tel Aviv University
Members of the 4th Knesset (1959–1961)
Members of the 5th Knesset (1961–1965)
Mapai politicians
Rafi (political party) politicians
Mandatory Palestine military personnel of World War II
Jewish Brigade personnel
Burials at Trumpeldor Cemetery